The 6"/50 caliber gun Mark 6 and Mark 8 (spoken "six-inch-fifty-caliber") were used for the secondary batteries of the United States Navy's  and  battleships, as well as the  and  armored cruisers. They were also used as the main battery on the  protected cruisers.

Design
The /50 caliber Mark 6 guns were developed around the time of the Spanish–American War. The gun card designates the gun as 46-caliber but the Bureau of Ordnance lists the guns as 50-caliber.

The Mark 6 gun was constructed of gun steel using a tube, jacket, four hoops, a locking ring, and Welin breech block. With the Mod 1 nickel-steel was used for the tube, two hoops and the locking ring, the gun was also hooped to the muzzle, because of this, the original muzzle velocity was able to be restored. The Mod 2 were Mod 0s with a hoop added to the chase along with a cylindrical liner made from nickel-steel. With these changes the original muzzle velocity was used.

The Mark 8 was similar to the Mark 6 Mod 1 but was constructed entirely out of nickel steel. The Mod 1 had a slightly smaller diameter chamber, but the same volume. The Mod 2 had its rifling grooves increased to 36 from 24 and didn't have the modified chamber of the Mod 1. The Mod 3 had a cylindrical liner made of nickel-steel along with a new chamber design and 36 grooves. Mod 4 used an earlier gun that had its liner replaced with a conical nickel-steel liner along with 36 grooves and the chamber of the Mod 3.

This gun is also unusual for the US Navy where the overall length of the gun barrel, is used to measure the caliber of the gun. (i.e.:300.2/6=50) Normally the bore length, would be used and this would actually be a 49 caliber gun. (i.e.:294/6=49)

Naval Service

The Maines had their guns reduced to eight in 1909, the guns would go on to arm auxiliary ships during World War I and again in World War II. After WW I, and as a result of the signing of the Washington Naval Treaty, many of these ships were scrapped; the guns were later put to use as coastal artillery.

Coast defense locations
6"/50 caliber ex-Navy guns were emplaced during World War II at numerous locations; most were operated by the United States Army Coast Artillery Corps. This list may not be exhaustive. They were grouped into two-gun batteries unless otherwise noted. Most of the batteries in CONUS were disestablished in 1943 as new defenses were built or the threat abated.

 Two guns near Fort Macon, Beaufort, NC
 Two guns near Freeport, TX
 Two guns in Battery Lobos, Fort Miley, San Francisco, CA
 Six guns in a two-gun and a four-gun battery, temporary defenses of Grays Harbor, Westport, WA
 Two guns in Battery Allen, Fort Babcock, Sitka, AK
 Two guns each in Alaska at Cold Bay, Chernofski, Umnak, George Island (one gun), Yakutat, Nome, Annette Island, Adak Island, Shemya Island, and Popof Island
 Two guns each in Batteries 954 and 604, Shalloway Point and Latine Point, Fort McAndrew, Argentia, Newfoundland
 Four guns in two batteries at Blunt's Point and Breakers Point, Pago Pago, American Samoa
 Four guns at Paramaribo, Suriname (formerly Dutch Guiana)

Surviving examples
Surviving 6"/50 caliber naval guns include:

 One Mark 8 gun, Naval Gun Factory 368, Nome airport, AK
 Two guns, Cannon Beach, Yakutat, AK
 One gun, city dump, Cold Bay, AK
 One gun, George Island, Cross Sound, AK
 Two Mark 8 Mod 2 guns, Midvale Nos. 550 and 554, Blunts Point, Pago Pago, American Samoa
 Two Mark 8 Mod 2 guns, Breakers Point, Pago Pago, American Samoa
 Four guns, Paramaribo, Suriname (formerly Dutch Guiana). One is a Mark 6 Mod 1, No. 309L, another is a Mark 6 Mod 2, No. 314L

See also
6"/30 caliber gun - includes 6"/40 caliber Mark 3 guns
6-inch gun M1897 - Army coast defense weapon of similar type and era

Weapons of comparable role, performance and era
 BL 6 inch Mk XI naval gun British equivalent
 15 cm/50 41st Year Type Japanese equivalent

Notes
Citations

Bibliography

Books
 
 

Online resources

External links
 Bluejackets Manual, 1917, 4th revision: US Navy 14-inch Mark 1 gun
 List of all US coastal forts and batteries at the Coast Defense Study Group, Inc. website
 FortWiki, lists most CONUS and Canadian forts

 

Naval guns of the United States
152 mm artillery
Coastal artillery